Josiah Tavita Tualamaliʻi is a Samoan New Zealand health and social justice advocate. He is the founder of the Pacific Youth Leadership and Transformation Council and was a member of the New Zealand government's inquiry into mental health and addiction.

Biography and early life 
Tualamaliʻi was born in Dunedin and was educated at Middleton Grange School. He is a graduate of the University of Canterbury where he gained a Bachelor of Arts in 2019. As a member of Christchurch's Pacific community, Tualamaliʻi helped establish the Pacific Youth Leadership and Transformation Council and has served as its treasurer and chair. Concurrently, Tualamaliʻi led the development of iSPEAK, a bi-monthly forum for Pacific youth to discuss issues affecting people in New Zealand, such as Christchurch's recovery from the 2011 earthquake and the development of a living wage campaign.

Health advocacy 
While serving on the board of Pacific wellbeing charity Le Va, Tualamaliʻi was appointed as a member of the New Zealand Government's Inquiry into Mental Health and Addiction. Subsequently, he was appointed as a member of the Psychotherapy Board of Aotearoa in 2019 and in 2020 became an advisor with lived experience for the Lancet Commission on Depression. The commission's report showed evidence that depression has become one of the leading causes of avoidable suffering globally.

Social justice advocacy 
In 2020, Tualamaliʻi brought a case to the Broadcasting Standards Authority against broadcaster Sean Plunket. While discussing an iwi roadblock intended to protect its elderly members from the COVID-19 pandemic, Plunket levelled accusations that a Māori iwi "did not care about child abuse". Tualamaliʻi's case was upheld and the Broadcasting Standards Authority fined Plunket's employer MediaWorks New Zealand and ordered it to issue an on-air apology for the “offensive and harmful” interview.

Tualamaliʻi led the campaign for the New Zealand government to issue a formal apology for the Dawn Raids after describing the actions as "government‑sanctioned racism". On 1 August 2021, a formal apology was given by New Zealand Prime Minister Jacinda Ardern in a public ifoga ceremony before 1,000 Pasifika guests at the Auckland Town Hall. As part of the apology, the government announced that it would provide resources for schools to teach the dawn raids, $2.1 million towards academic and vocational scholarships for Pacific communities and $1 million towards Manaaki New Zealand short term scholarship training courses for delegates from Samoa, Tonga, Tuvalu, and Fiji.

Tualamaliʻi delivered a keynote address to the Summit for Democracy in 2021 alongside New Zealand Prime Minister Jacinda Ardern and President of the United States Joe Biden. This was a virtual summit hosted by the United States "to renew democracy at home and confront autocracies abroad". Tualamaliʻi was a participant in the Youth Town Hall, chaired by the Ambassador of the United States to the United Nations Linda Thomas-Greenfield.

Recognition and awards 
Tualamaliʻi won a Civic Award for Youth Advocacy from the Christchurch City Council in 2016 and was nationally recognised the same year with the Prime Minister's Pacific Youth Leadership and Inspiration Award. He received the Pacific Emerging Leadership Award in 2020.

Tualamaliʻi was named as a semi-finalist for the Young New Zealander of the Year Awards in 2022 alongside fellow University of Canterbury alumnus and author, Abbas Nazari.

Bibliography 

 Government Inquiry into Mental Health and Addiction. (2018). He Ara Oranga : Report of the Government Inquiry into Mental Health and Addiction. Government of New Zealand
 El Omrani, O., Carmen, V. A., Bionat, J. F., Ghebreyesus, T. A., Fore, H., & Wickramanayake, J. (2021). COVID-19, mental health, and Young People's engagement. Journal of Adolescent Health. https://doi.org/10.1016/j.jadohealth.2021.03.02
 Radio New Zealand. (2020). Episode 15: Josiah Tualamaliʻi. Radio New Zealand. Retrieved April 12, 2022, from https://www.rnz.co.nz/programmes/the-outliers/story/2018746471/episode-15-josiah-tualamali-i-the-outliers.

References

External links 
 Profile on Ministry of Youth Development website
 Profile on the Institute of Directors website

University of Canterbury alumni
Mental health in New Zealand
Living people
People from Dunedin in health professions
People from Christchurch
Year of birth missing (living people)